António Fernandes may refer to:

 Álvaro Fernandes, 15th Century Portuguese slave-trader and explorer
 António Fernandes (explorer), (?–c. 1525) 16th century Portuguese explorer who traveled in Zambia and Zimbabwe
 António Fernandes (Jesuit) (c. 1569–1642), Portuguese Jesuit missionary
 Antonio Fernandes (politician), Indian politician

See also
 Antonio Fernández (disambiguation)